The Chatham Island merganser (Mergus milleneri) is an extinct species of merganser duck.

The Chatham merganser is known only from subfossils, so not much is known about the bird. It was the smallest of all Mergus species. Fossil records indicate it was widespread on Chatham Island but not on the smaller nearby islands.

The binomial name refers to Dr Philip Millener, to recognise his work in collecting material on the species.

See also 
 New Zealand merganser

References 

milleneri
Late Quaternary prehistoric birds
Quaternary birds of Oceania
Birds of the Chatham Islands
Extinct birds of New Zealand
Extinct birds of subantarctic islands
Holocene extinctions
Birds described in 2014
Fossil taxa described in 2014